Powell's Tavern is a historic inn and tavern located at Manakin, Goochland County, Virginia. The earliest section was built about 1808, with additions made by 1815 and 1820. It is a two-story, "H"-shaped brick and frame building.  The original section is a two-story frame block with a gable roof and two low one-story wings with shed roofs. It is connected to the later two-story, five-bay brick section by a two-story hyphen added in 1958.

It was listed on the National Register of Historic Places in 1973.

References

Drinking establishments on the National Register of Historic Places in Virginia
Federal architecture in Virginia
Commercial buildings completed in 1802
Buildings and structures in Goochland County, Virginia
National Register of Historic Places in Goochland County, Virginia